"Morqe Sahar" (translated as Dawn Bird / Bird of Dawn / The Nightingale) is an Iranian tasnif written by Mohammad-Taqi Bahar and composed by Morteza Neidavoud in early 20th century under the influence of Iranian constitutional revolution. Some people say that Bahar wrote this poem while he was in prison but on the other hand, some people say that he didn't write this poem in prison because although Bahar had a tempestuous relationship with Shah at that time but He represented the parliament. Morqe Sahar was first recorded, in 1927, by Iranoddole Helen or Taj Esfahani. Moluk Zarrabi is also noted as one of the earliest singers to record Morgh-e sahar. Its content deals with political and social issues. It was later performed by numerous Iranian singers including Qamar-ol-Moluk Vaziri, Mohammad-Reza Shajarian, Leila Forouhar, Homayoun Shajarian, Farhad Mehrad, Shakila, Mohsen Namjoo, Reza Sadeghi, and Hengameh Akhavan.

The song gained heightened popularity as the encore song performed by Maestro Mohammad Reza Shajarian, at the end of every single one of his concerts. It is widely regarded by scholars and academics as "The Unofficial National Anthem for Iranian Freedom".

Lyrics

In popular culture
 Morq-e Sahar (spelled as "Morghe Sahar") was the theme for the Persian civilization in the videogame Civilization V, and also an ambient theme for the Persian civilization in Civilization VI.
 Morq-e Sahar (spelled as "Morghe Sahar") was featured as the through line in the Academy Award shortlisted documentary feature, The Voice of Dust and Ash, that tells the life story of Maestro Mohammad Reza Shajarian.

External links
 Mohammadreza Shajarian, Tasnif: Morghe Sahar
 ENCYCLOPÆDIA IRANICA
 Lyrics

References

Persian-language songs